Marthe Marie Amélie Angèle Simard née Caillaud, later Reid-Simard (6 April 1901 – 28 March 1993), was a Franco-Canadian politician.

Simard was the first French woman to sit in a parliamentary assembly.

In December 1940, she founded the Free France Committee of Quebec.

She was a member of the Legion of Honor. She was also decorated with the Resistance Medal and the Commemorative Medal for Volunteer Services in Free France. The Place Marthe-Simard in the 14th arrondissement of Paris commemorates her.

References

External links
 Un Français Libre parmi 52 200 - Marthe Simard
 La citoyenneté politique des femmes, Assemblée nationale
 La liberté retrouvée, la souveraineté restaurée - Le vote des femmes, Sénat

Further reading
 Éric Amyot, Le Québec entre Pétain et de Gaulle, Montréal, Fides, 1999 , lire en ligne [archive])
 Jean-Louis Debré, Valérie Bochenek, Ces femmes qui ont réveillé la France, Paris, Arthème Fayard, 2013,  pp. 297-304 
 Jean-Louis Debré, Les Oubliés de la République, Paris, Arthème Fayard, 2008 
 Frédéric Smith, "La France appelle votre secours". Québec et la France libre, 1940-1945, VLB Éditeur, Montréal, 2012

1901 births
1993 deaths
20th-century Canadian politicians
20th-century Canadian women politicians
Naturalized citizens of Canada